Marina Kopcalic (born 23 February 1971) is an Australian handball player. She competed in the women's tournament at the 2000 Summer Olympics.

References

External links
 

1971 births
Living people
Australian female handball players
Olympic handball players of Australia
Handball players at the 2000 Summer Olympics
Handball players from Belgrade